Diving Coaster is a steel Dive Coaster at Happy Valley Shanghai in Songjiang, Shanghai, China. It was manufactured by Bolliger & Mabillard and opened on August 16, 2009.

Ride experience

Once riders are seated and restrained, the train makes a right out of the station and begins to climb the  lift hill. Once at the top, the train makes a U-turn to the right and comes to a stop by a holding brake, right before dropping. After a few seconds, the train drops and enters an immelmann loop. The train then enters the mid course brake run, drops into a tunnel and makes a right turn, dropping into the splashdown element. Riders then go through a couple turns and dips and enter the final brake run.

References

Roller coasters in China
Dive Coasters manufactured by Bolliger & Mabillard